Severinovca (Severynivka, Severinovka) is a village in the Camenca District of Transnistria, Moldova. It has since 1990 been administered as a part of the breakaway Pridnestrovian Moldavian Republic (PMR).

Severinovca is the birthplace of Pyotr Vershigora.

References

Villages of Transnistria
Olgopolsky Uyezd
Camenca District